Julia Greenshields (born February 12, 1992) is a Canadian rugby union player, in the sevens discipline.

Career
Greenshields was part of Canada's 2018 Commonwealth Games team that finished in fourth place.

In June 2021, Greenshields was chosen as part of Canada's 2020 Olympic team.

References

1992 births
Living people
Sportspeople from Sarnia
Canada international rugby sevens players
Commonwealth Games rugby sevens players of Canada
Rugby sevens players at the 2018 Commonwealth Games
Canadian female rugby union players
Rugby sevens players at the 2020 Summer Olympics
Olympic rugby sevens players of Canada
Canada international women's rugby sevens players